Jerry Thompson may refer to:
 Jerry Thompson (athlete), American long-distance runner
 Jerry D. Thompson, professor of history 
 Jerry Thompson (American football), American football and baseball player and coach

See also
 Jeri Kehn Thompson, American radio talk show host